Robert Carl Parucha is a television actor who is most likely remembered for his ongoing roles in daytime soap operas as Matt Miller The Young and the Restless and as Eddie Reed in The Days of Our Lives. He is also an author.

Background
Parucha was born in Los Angeles County, California, on October 2, 1955. He attended UC Santa Barbara, where he got a bachelor's degree in Psychology and master's degree in Religious Studies.

He is married with three children.

In The Young and the Restless, he played the part of Matt, brother of Victor. His character was also the son of Albert Miller, played by George Kennedy. He played that role from 1985 to 1987. From 1988 to 1989, he played Eddie Reed in The Days of Our Lives until the role was taken over by Deke Anderson.

Career
One of Parucha's earliest roles played was Dean in Dynasty in the "Reunion in Singapore", which was aired on ABC on March 2, 1983. In January 1984, he appeared as Mark Tanner in an Emerald Point N.A.S. episode, "Secrets". On January 16, episode #1.3267 of The Young and the Restless was aired. He played the role of Matt Miller. Many more episodes featuring him were to follow. By the mid 80's his status as a soap opera star was evident, and he appeared at various public events with other celebrities and television actors. In 1986, Parucha was co-hosting a televised fashion show, "Spring Fashions for Men and Women".

According to the St. Louis Post-Dispatch in its September 20, 1987 issue, the writing was on the wall that he as Matt Miller in  The Young and the Restless was being phased out.

Years later in 2003 and again February 18–19, 2020, when he reprised his Matt Miller role.

Partial filmography

Publications

References

External links
 Imdb: Robert Parucha

Living people
1955 births
People from Los Angeles
American male film actors
American male television actors
American male soap opera actors